No Man No Cry may refer to:
"No Man No Cry" (Sugababes song), 2002
"No Man No Cry" (Kelly Rowland song), 2008